Darren Grant (born 25 April 1963) is  a former Australian rules footballer who played with Footscray in the Victorian Football League (VFL).		
		
Grant was originally from Sale City, in the North Gippsland Football League. His only league appearance for Footscray was in their round 18 loss to Carlton at Princes Park in the 1982 VFL season. The 129 point winning margin was a then club record for Carlton, over any team. He later played in South Australia with Central District and Woodville.

Notes

External links 
		

1963 births
Living people
Australian rules footballers from Victoria (Australia)
Western Bulldogs players
Central District Football Club players
Woodville Football Club players